Phostria leucophasma is a moth in the family Crambidae. It was described by Harrison Gray Dyar Jr. in 1912. It is found in Mexico and Peru.

The wingspan is about 30 mm. The wings are tan brown, with white subhyaline spaces. There is a speck near the base of the cell and a larger one below, as well as a round spot in the end of the cell, a pyriform (pear-shaped) one below it from which extend five spots to the costa, the three below small and dislocated by a blackish cloud, the two upper larger, quadrate and fused. The hindwings have two spots touching at their angles, the one on the inner margin running into the cell, the discal one farther out and running upward toward the costa.

References

Phostria
Moths described in 1912
Moths of Central America
Moths of South America